The year 1619 in music involved some significant events.

Events 
none listed

Publications 
Paolo Agostini – , book 1 (Rome: Luca Antonio Soldi)
Gregorio Allegri – Second book of concertini for two, three, and four voices (Rome: Luca Antonio Soldi)
Giovanni Francesco Anerio
 (Rome: Giovanni Battista Robletti), a collection of oratorios
 (Rome: Luca Antonio Soldi), a collection of arias, canzonettas, and madrigals
 (A Garland of sacred roses) (Rome: Luca Antonio Soldi), a collection of motets for five voices
Adriano Banchieri –  for four voices, Op. 41 (Venice: Gardano)
Valerio Bona –  for two choirs (Venice: Giacomo Vincenti)
Antonio Brunelli – 3 Requiem masses for four and seven voices, Op. 14 (Venice: Giacomo Vincenti), also includes Improperia for six voices and a Miserere for four voices
Sulpitia Cesis –  for eight voices (Modena: Giuliano Cassiani)
Antonio Cifra
First book of masses (Rome: Luca Antonio Soldi)
 for two, three, and four voices (Rome: Luca Antonio Soldi)
Christoph Demantius
 for five, six, seven, and eight voices (Freiberg: Melchior Hoffmann), a collection of introits, masses, and sequences
 for six voices (Freiberg: Georg Hoffmann), written for the wedding of Augustus Pragern and Martha Lincken
 for eight voices (Freiberg: Georg Hoffmann), an epithalamium setting text from Chapter Four of the Song of Songs
 for eight voices (Freiberg: Georg Hoffmann), an epithalamium
 for eight voices (Freiberg: Georg Hoffmann), an epithalamium setting text from Chapter Twenty-Six of the Book of Sirach
Melchior Franck
 for four voices (Coburg: Kaspar Bertsch), a collection of quodlibets
 for five voices (Coburg: Andreas Forckel), a wedding motet
, for five voices (Coburg: Kaspar Bertsch), a wedding motet
 for four voices (Coburg: Kaspar Bertsch), a funeral motet
Hans Leo Hassler –  (German Litany) for seven voices (Nuremberg: Balthasar Scherff), published posthumously
Giovanni Girolamo Kapsberger
Carlo Milanuzzi
 for two, three, and four voices, Op. 1 (Venice: Giacomo Vincenti), a collection of motets
First book of Vespers psalms for two voices and organ, Op. 2 (Venice: Giacomo Vincenti)
Claudio Monteverdi –  (Seventh Book of madrigals for five voices) (Venice: Bartolomeo Magni for Gardano)
Pietro Pace
, Op. 18 (Venice: Giacomo Vincenti)
The eighth book of motets..., Op. 19 (Venice: Giacomo Vincenti)
Psalms for eight voices..., Op. 20 (Venice: Alessandro Vincenti)
The ninth book of motets..., Op. 21 (Venice: Alessandro Vincenti)
Claudio Pari – , fourth book of madrigals for five voices (Palermo: Giovanni Battista Maringo)
Georg Patermann – Votum nuptiale, for the wedding of Conrad and Catharina Huswedel (Rostock: Joachim Pedanus)
Serafino Patta – , for five voices and organ (Venice: Alessandro Gardano)
Michael Praetorius – , part 3
Heinrich Schütz – Psalmen Davids (Psalms of David)
Thomas Vautor – The First Set: ... Apt for Vyols or Voyces

Classical music

Opera 
none listed

Births 
February 28 – Giuseppe Felice Tosi, singer, organist and composer (d. c.1693)
August 6 – Barbara Strozzi, Italian singer and composer (d. 1677)
date unknown – Johann Rosenmüller, German composer (d. 1684)
probable
Anthoni van Noordt, Dutch organist and composer (d. 1675)
Juan García de Zéspedes, composer, singer, viol player and teacher

Deaths 
January 29 – Daniel Bacheler, English lutenist and composer (born 1572)
October 23 – Nicholas Yonge, singer and publisher (born c.1560)
date unknown – Giacomo Vincenti, Venetian music printer

References

 
17th century in music
Music by year